Guangyun is a 1008 Chinese rime dictionary. 

Guangyun may also refer to:
Guangyun Subdistrict, a subdistrict in Wucheng County, Shandong, China
Guangyun Temple, Buddhist temple in Cangyuan Va Autonomous County, Yunnan, China

Historical eras
Guangyun (586–587), era name used by Emperor Jing of Western Liang
Guangyun (974–979), era name used by Liu Jiyuan, emperor of Northern Han
Guangyun (1034–1036), era name used by Emperor Jingzong of Western Xia